Blue Valley West High School is a fully accredited public high school located in Overland Park, Kansas, United States, and one of five high schools by Blue Valley USD 229 school district, and has a current enrollment of approximately 1,280 students. The principal is Katherine  Bonnema. The school mascot is the Jaguar and the school colors are red, black, and silver. In the 2013 Newsweek rankings of the top high schools in America, Blue Valley West was ranked 1st in the state of Kansas and 439th in the nation.

Blue Valley West High School opened in August 2001 in order to help educate the increasing population of Overland Park. It was the fourth high school in the Blue Valley Unified School District to open, preceded by Blue Valley Northwest High School in 1993. Blue Valley West is a member of the Kansas State High School Activities Association and offers a variety of sports programs. Athletic teams compete in the 6A division and are known as the "Jaguars". Extracurricular activities are also offered in the form of performing arts, school publications, and clubs.

History
Blue Valley West High School opened in August 2001 in order to help educate the increasing population of Overland Park. It was the fourth high school in the Blue Valley Unified School District to open, preceded by Blue Valley Northwest High School in 1993, and followed by Blue Valley Southwest High School in 2010.

Academics
The school offers 17 Advanced Placement classes, foreign language in Spanish and French, and performing and visual arts classes, among others. The Journalism department produces The Spotlight(newspaper) and The Illumination(yearbook). Its broadcasting class produces Jagged Edge TV. The class of 2013 achieved an average score of 1828 on the SAT and 25 on the ACT.

Extracurricular activities
The Jaguars compete in the Eastern Kansas League and are classified as a 6A-5A school according to the KSHSAA. Throughout its history, Blue Valley West has won several state championships in various sports. Many graduates have gone on to participate in collegiate athletics. In the 2006–2007 school year the school won 2 state championships, was runner up for another, and had 4 other teams qualify for the state tournament. In the 2007 calendar year, BV West won the state title in football, boys' basketball, and baseball. This three-peat was the first of its kind in the history of KSHSAA competition.

Athletics

Football
The Blue Valley West Jaguar football team has become a contender in Kansas 6A football. The team's main rivals are Blue Valley High School and Saint Thomas Aquinas High School. Blue Valley West and Blue Valley have also developed a rivalry. Blue Valley West won the 2007 Eastern Kansas League title and went on to win the Kansas 5A State Championship on November 24, 2007, with an undefeated 13–0 season.

Boys' basketball
The boys basketball team won their first state title during the 2006–2007 school year.

Bishop Miege and Saint Thomas Aquinas are the basketball team's two primary rivals.

Golf
The Jaguars have won three team state titles. In 2002, the team won its first 5A state championship. This was followed by 6A state championships in 2006 and 2013.

Baseball
The baseball team won the Eastern Kansas League (EKL) title every year from the school's opening in 2001 to 2006, and did not lose a single game in conference until 2006. The baseball team won state championships in 2007 and 2022.

Girls' Bowling
The girls' bowling team was established during the 2011-2012 winter sports season to add more sports available to girls in the school.

Performing arts
The school has a theater group that presents three shows a year as part of the school curriculum. Choir programs offered include concert choir, choraliers, chorale and chamber. The last three of which require an audition.

Band
Blue Valley West has a competitive marching band, a concert band, a symphonic band, and a symphonic wind ensemble. The competitive marching band won the Kansas Bandmasters Association Marching Band Championship and also placed top 25 in the Bands of America St. Louis Super Regional Championship in the 2017–18 and 2018-19 school years.

Notable alumni
 Matt Besler (Class of 2005), MLS player for Sporting Kansas City
 Andrew Gachkar (Class of 2007), former NFL player for several teams
 Madison Lilley (Class of 2017), professional volleyball player and member of U.S. national team
 Shannon Vreeland (Class of 2010), gold medalist in the 200 Freestyle Relay at 2012 Summer Olympics
 Andrew Wojtanik (Class of 2008), winner of the 2004 National
Geographic Bee

See also
 List of high schools in Kansas
 List of unified school districts in Kansas
Other high schools in Blue Valley USD 229 school district
 Blue Valley High School in Stilwell
 Blue Valley North High School in Overland Park
 Blue Valley Northwest High School in Overland Park
 Blue Valley Southwest High School in Overland Park
 Blue Valley Academy in Overland Park

References

External links

 School Website
 Blue Valley USD 229 school district
 District School Boundary Map

Public high schools in Kansas
Educational institutions established in 2001
Education in Overland Park, Kansas
Schools in Johnson County, Kansas
2001 establishments in Kansas